Great Friends (Spanish:Grandes amigos) is a 1967 Spanish drama film directed by Luis Lucia and starring Nino Del Arco, Manuel Gil and Eva Guerr.

Cast
 Nino Del Arco as Nino  
 Manuel Gil as El Maestro 
 Eva Guerr as La madre  
 Julio Goróstegui as El Titiritero  
 Antonio Moreno as El Maquinista  
 Aníbal Vela as El Fogonero  
 Blaki as El ferroviario  
 Sergio Mendizábal as El Cura  
 Emilio Rodríguez as El Camionero  
 Ángel Luis Nolías 
 Ángel León 
 Luis María Hidalgo
 Ramón Fernández Tejela 
 Manuel Guitián 
 Rafael Alcántara 
 Goyo Lebrero 
 José Fernández 
 Herminia Tejela 
 Manolita Guerrero
 Peter Damon as El Pastor

References

Bibliography
 Peter Cowie & Derek Elley. World Filmography: 1967. Fairleigh Dickinson University Press, 1977.

External links 

1967 films
Spanish drama films
1967 drama films
1960s Spanish-language films
Films directed by Luis Lucia
Films scored by Gregorio García Segura
1960s Spanish films